S. Patricia Becerra is a biochemist specializing in the retina. She researches protein structure and function in relation to drug development for combating blindness. Becerra is a senior investigator at the National Eye Institute.

Early life and education 
Becerra was born in Lima. She attended Pontifical Catholic University of Peru before completing a bachelor of science at Cayetano Heredia University. Becerra received her Ph.D. in biochemistry from the University of Navarra in 1979 studying lipid-protein interactions of liver mitochondria enzymes. Becerra then returned to Wilson's lab as an expert to study structure-function relationships of HIV reverse transcriptase.

Career 
Becerra joined the National Eye Institute (NEI) as a visiting scientist in 1991, became an investigator in 1994, and was promoted to principal investigator in 2001 to study the biochemistry of PEDF. The interests of her section are in protein structure as it relates to function, with a focus on the interactions of components involved in cell differentiation, survival, and maintenance. Her research at NEI has applied these interests to systems in the retina. Becerra also investigates protein structure and function in relation to drug development for combating blindness.

Selected works

References 

Living people
Year of birth missing (living people)
National Institutes of Health people
20th-century women scientists
21st-century women scientists
Women medical researchers
Expatriate academics in the United States
20th-century Peruvian scientists
21st-century Peruvian scientists
Peruvian women scientists
Peruvian medical researchers
Peruvian chemists
Women biochemists
Peruvian biologists
20th-century biologists
21st-century biologists
20th-century chemists
21st-century chemists
Peruvian emigrants to the United States
People from Lima
University of Navarra alumni